Tawalli "Loving the Ahl al-Bayt", is a part of the Twelver Shī‘ah Islām Aspects of the Religion and is derived from a Qur'anic verse.Furthermore, the Sunni and Shī‘ah Hadith of the Event of the Cloak is used to define who is Muḥammad's near relatives.

See also
Ancillaries of the Faith
Walayah

External links
https://archive.today/20120707002524/http://al-islam.org/organizations/aalimnetwork/msg00369.html

Family of Muhammad
Shia Islam